Nicolás González Iglesias (born 3 January 2002), sometimes known as just Nico, is a Spanish professional footballer who plays as a midfielder for La Liga club Valencia on loan from Barcelona.

Club career
Nico was born in A Coruña, Galicia, and started his career with local side Montañeros at the age of seven. In December 2012, he agreed to a move to Barcelona, effective as of the following July.

On 19 May 2019, aged just 17, Nico made his senior debut for the reserves, coming on as a late substitute for Kike Saverio in a 2–1 Segunda División B away loss against Castellón. In the 2020–21 season, he was initially a member of the Juvenil A before starting to feature regularly for the B-team from November 2020 onwards.

On 12 May 2021, Nico renewed his contract until 2024, with a €500 million buyout clause. After featuring in the main squad during the pre-season, he made his first team – and La Liga – debut on 15 August, replacing Sergio Busquets in the opening game of the 2021–22 La Liga season, a 4–2 win over Real Sociedad.

Nico scored his first professional goal on 12 December 2021, netting the opener in a 2–2 away draw against Osasuna.

On 13 August 2022, Nico renewed his contract until 2026, and later signed with Valencia on a season-long loan.

Personal life
He is the son of former Spanish footballer and Deportivo La Coruña legend Fran González and the nephew of José Ramón.

Career statistics

Club

Notes

References

External links

2002 births
Living people
Footballers from A Coruña
Spanish footballers
Spain youth international footballers
Spain under-21 international footballers
Association football midfielders
Segunda División B players
La Liga players
FC Barcelona Atlètic players
FC Barcelona players
Valencia CF players